Ariane Le Fort (born 18 June 1960) is a Belgian writer.

Biography 
The daughter of a Swiss father and a Belgian mother, she was born in Mons and grew up there and in Brussels. She studied Latin and Greek at the Athénée Royal de Rixensart, then spent a year at Goshen College in Indiana and went on to study journalism and communications at the Université libre de Bruxelles. Le Fort has worked as a journalist, as a librarian, as a retail clerk in a book store and as a homework tutor. She is also mother of two children and teaches writing. Le Fort works hard to balance these activities with her writing.

Selected works 
 L'eau froide efface les rêves, novel (1989)
 Comment font les autres?, novel (1994)
 Rassurez-vous, tout le monde a peur, novel (1999)
 Beau-fils, novel (2003), received the Prix Victor-Rossel
 On ne va pas se quitter comme ça ?, novel (2010)
 Avec plaisir, François, novel (2013)

References 

1960 births
Living people
Belgian journalists
Goshen College alumni
Writers from Brussels
Université libre de Bruxelles alumni
Belgian women novelists
20th-century Belgian novelists
21st-century Belgian novelists
20th-century Belgian women writers
21st-century Belgian women writers
Belgian women journalists